Aglaia lepidopetala is a species of plant in the family Meliaceae. It is found in Indonesia and Papua New Guinea.

References

lepidopetala
Near threatened plants
Taxonomy articles created by Polbot